Somersham Town Football Club is a football club based in Somersham, near St Ives in Cambridgeshire, England.

History
The club were established in December 1893 and played in local leagues until World War II, winning the Hunts Junior Cup in 1919–20, 1931–32 and 1935–36. In 1950 the club joined Division One of the Peterborough & District League. They finished second in 1952–53 and were promoted to the Premier Division. In 1969–70 they finished bottom of the table with only three points, but were not relegated. In 1972–73 they won the Hunts Senior Cup and the Peterborough Senior Cup.

They joined the Eastern Counties League in 1988 as founder members of Division One. In 1993–94 they won the Senior Cup again and again in 2000–01. In 2003–04 they finished bottom of Division One, and dropped into the Premier Division of the Cambridgeshire League. In 2007 they were relegated to the Senior A Division after finishing bottom of the Premier Division. They returned to the Premier Division after finishing third in 2009–10.

At the end of the 2011–12 season the club's first team folded, with the reserve team in Division One B becoming the new first team. After finishing second in 2012–13, they were promoted to the Senior B Division. They earned a successive second promotion in 2013–14 after finishing as runners-up.

Ground
In 1960 the club bought some farmland and built the West End Ground, having previously played on a nearby recreation ground. Floodlights were added in 1991, and were officially inaugurated in a friendly game against Norwich City in November 1992, a game which set the ground's attendance record of 538.

Honours
Hunts Senior Cup
Winners 1972–73, 1993–94, 2000–01
Peterborough Senior Cup
Winners 1972–73
Hinchinbrooke Cup
Winners 1953–54
Hunts Junior Cup
Winners 1919–20, 1931–32, 1935–36

Records
Attendance (at the West End Ground): 538 vs Norwich City, friendly match, November 1992
FA Cup best performance: First qualifying round: 1954–55, 1958–59 
FA Vase best performance: First round: 1983–84, 1984–85, 1985–86, 1999–00

References

External links
Club website

Football clubs in England
Football clubs in Cambridgeshire
Association football clubs established in 1893
1893 establishments in England
Peterborough and District Football League
Eastern Counties Football League
Cambridgeshire County Football League